Felix Rinner (6 January 1911 – 2 April 1976) was an Austrian sprinter and an officer of the Austrian SS. 

He competed in the men's 200 metres at the 1936 Summer Olympics. Rinner was a ten time national champion across four different sprint events in the 1930s.

When Austria was annexed by Germany, on March 11, 1938, he led a command of 40 armed SS men who forced their way in and occupied the Austrian Federal Chancellery.

In 1941 Rinner was a member of the Austrian SS (Obersturmbannführer) to the SS Panzergrenadier Division “Viking”, was Adjutant to SS leader Ernst Kaltenbrunner (1903-1946, executed by hanging in Berlin for being a major perpetrator of the Holocaust), the commander of the entire Austrian SS, and was involved in the organization of the Gestapo in Austria. From 1945-47 Rinner was interned by the Americans.

References

External links
 

1911 births
1976 deaths
Athletes (track and field) at the 1932 Summer Olympics
Athletes (track and field) at the 1936 Summer Olympics
Austrian male sprinters
Olympic athletes of Austria
Place of birth missing
Austrian Nazis
Gestapo personnel
SS-Obersturmbannführer